Stauropolis, Stauroupolis, Stavroupoli(s), or Stavropoli(s) ( 'city of the cross', genitive Σταυροπόλεος Stauropoleos) may refer to various places and other entities. The spelling in u is a transliteration; the spelling in v reflects the Byzantine and modern pronunciation.

Places
 Stauroupolis, the Byzantine name of Aphrodisias in Caria, Asia Minor
 Stavroupoli, a suburb of Thessaloniki, Greece
 Stavroupoli, Xanthi, a village in Northern Greece
 Stavros (Galatia), ancient town in Asia Minor, also called Stavropolis; see Verinopolis

Other
 1147 Stavropolis, a stony asteroid named for the Russian city
 Milo Stavroupolis, a character on Little House on the Prairie
 Stauropolis (diocese), the former diocese of Aphrodisias, subsisting as a Greek Orthodox and Roman Catholic titular see
 Stavropoleos Monastery in Bucharest, Romania

See also
 Stavros (disambiguation), name of various places, some also called Stavropolis
 Stavropol (disambiguation), various locations in Russia
 Stavropolsky (disambiguation), various locations in Russia
 Stavrochori (disambiguation), various villages in Greece
 Stavropoulos, Greek family name
 Stauropolia, a genus of moth